Trephionus is a genus of ground beetles in the family Carabidae. There are about 19 described species in Trephionus, found in Japan. Five of these were new species described in 2018.

Description
All the species are reddish brown to black in color with a shiny surface. Mouthpart appendages and antennae are yellowish to reddish brown, and the legs are light to blackish brown. There are no hind wings. The eyes are less convex, the pronotum is moderately convex, and the elytra are oblong and moderately convex.

Species
 Trephionus abiba Sasakawa & Itô, 2018
 Trephionus babai Habu, 1978
 Trephionus bifidilobatus Sasakawa & Itô, 2018
 Trephionus chujoi Habu, 1961
 Trephionus cylindriphallus Sasakawa, 2018
 Trephionus igai Ueno, 1955
 Trephionus inexpectatus Sasakawa, 2018
 Trephionus karosai Ueno, 1955
 Trephionus kinoshitai Habu, 1954
 Trephionus kyushuensis Habu, 1978
 Trephionus microphthalmus Ueno, 1955
 Trephionus mikii Habu, 1966
 Trephionus nikkoensis Bates, 1883
 Trephionus niumontanus Sasakawa, 2018
 Trephionus obscurus Ueno, 1955
 Trephionus shibataianus Habu, 1978
 Trephionus sordidatus Habu, 1954
 Trephionus subcavicola Ueno, 1955
 Trephionus takakurai Habu, 1954

References

Platyninae